The Military ranks of Hungary are the military insignia used by the Hungarian Defence Forces. The Land Forces and Air Force ranks are the same, as the Hungarian Defense Forces are an integrated service. Hungary is a landlocked country and does not possess a navy.

Branch colours

Commissioned officer ranks
The rank insignia of commissioned officers.

Other ranks
The rank insignia of non-commissioned officers and enlisted personnel.

See also
 Rank insignia of the Austro-Hungarian Army
 Military ranks of the Kingdom of Hungary
 Ranks of the Hungarian People's Army

References

External links
 
 

Hungary
Military of Hungary